Marie "Mame" Bassine Niang (1951 - September 27, 2013) was a Senegalese lawyer.

Biography 
Born into a Muslim family in 1951 in Tambacounda, Senegal, Mame Bassin Niang studied law in France at the French commune of Aix-en-Provence. After her studies, she returned to Senegal to become the first black woman lawyer at the Dakar Bar in 1975.

Her professional career focused on the defense of human rights in a context of restricted freedom of thought. Her commitment led her to create the Organisation Nationale des Droits de L’Homme du Sénégal (ONDH) (english: National Organization for Human Rights of Senegal), of which she was the first president.

Considered as a feminist icon and concerned by the issue of women's emancipation, she was one of the founding members of the Association des Juristes Sénégalaises (AJS) (english: Association of Senegalese Jurists). She was at the point the Vice President of the Fondation internationale des femmes juriste (IFAD), (English: International Foundation of Women Lawyers). She was High Commissioner for Human Rights under the presidency of Abdoulaye Wade. She died on September 27, 2013 in Dakar following a long illness at the age of 62.

See also 
 List of first women lawyers and judges in Africa

References 

Senegalese women lawyers
1951 births
2013 deaths
People from Tambacounda Region
20th-century Senegalese lawyers
21st-century Senegalese lawyers
20th-century women lawyers
21st-century women lawyers